The Paraguayan U-17 women's national football team is the national women's under-17 soccer team of Paraguay. They are controlled by the Asociación Paraguaya de Fútbol. They finished 3rd in the 2008 and 2013 South American Under-17 Women's Championship.

Records

U-17 Women's World Cup record

South American Under-17 Women's Championship record

Current squad

Previous squads
2008 FIFA U-17 Women's World Cup
2014 FIFA U-17 Women's World Cup
2016 South American Under-17 Women's Football Championship

See also
 Paraguay women's national football team (senior)
 Paraguay women's national under-20 football team
 Paraguay men's national under-17 football team
 Football in Paraguay

References

External links
 Paraguayan Football Association Website

Women's national under-17 association football teams
u-17